Russell "Lucky" Hayden (born Hayden Michael "Pate" Lucid; June 12, 1912 – June 9, 1981) was an American film and television actor. He is best known for his portrayal as Lucky Jenkins in Paramount's popular Hopalong Cassidy film series.

Early life
He was born as Hayden Michael "Pate" Lucid, son of Francis J. Lucid and the former Minnie Harvey. He later took the name Russell Hayden to honor a friend, cameraman Russell Harlan.

Career
Hayden's screen debut was in Hills of Old Wyoming (1937), a Hopalong Cassidy film. In 27 films, he played Lucky Jenkins, one of a trio of heroes in the Cassidy westerns starring William Boyd, then co-starred with Charles Starrett in other westerns.

In 1947, he played both the main hero and villain in the film Trail of the Mounties.

In 1950, Hayden appeared as "Marshal #1" in several episodes of the live-broadcast and short-lived ABC series The Marshal of Gunsight Pass.

In the 1952–1953 season, Hayden teamed with Jackie Coogan, a former child actor in the 39-episode syndicated series Cowboy G-Men.

In the late 1950s, he produced and directed through his Quintet Productions two syndicated western series, 26 Men, black-and-white program starring Tristram Coffin, and Judge Roy Bean, a color production, with Edgar Buchanan, Jack Buetel, and Jackie Loughery. Hayden also appeared himself as Steve, a Texas Ranger, in twelve episodes of Judge Roy Bean, a family-oriented program considered at odds with the real Roy Bean.

Hayden and fellow western actor Dick Curtis helped to develop Pioneertown, a western movie set near Palm Springs, which has been used in western films and television episodes.

Hayden was married from 1938 to 1943 to actress Jan Clayton, who was later cast as the first mother on the Lassie television series on CBS. The couple had a daughter, Sandra Hayden (1940–1956). In 1946 Hayden wed screen actress Lillian Porter, who retired from pictures. The Haydens remained happily married until his death on June 9, 1981, three days before his 69th birthday. 

Hayden is interred at Oakwood Memorial Park Cemetery in Chatsworth, California.

References

External links

 
 
 Russell Hayden biography

American male film actors
American male television actors
Burials at Oakwood Memorial Park Cemetery
People from Chico, California
Male actors from Palm Springs, California
1912 births
1981 deaths
20th-century American male actors
20th-century American businesspeople
Columbia Pictures contract players